The FV300 series was a project for a series of lightweight armoured fighting vehicles by the United Kingdom between 1947–50, a few years after World War II.

History
The development and construction of the tank was carried out by Vickers. However, only two prototypes were built. The project ended in 1950 at the prototype stage.

Variants
FV301  21 ton tank with 77mm gun
FV302  GPO/CPO Command Vehicle
FV303  20pdr Self Propelled Gun - 20 pounder
FV304  25pdr Self Propelled Gun - 25 pounder gun/howitzer
FV305  5.5 inch Self Propelled Gun - BL 5.5 inch Medium Gun
FV306  Light Armoured Recovery Vehicle
FV307  Radar Vehicle
FV308  Field Artillery Tractor
FV309  Royal Artillery section vehicle
FV310  Armoured Personnel Carrier
FV311  Armoured Load Carrier

External links

Arcane Fighting Vehicles
HenkofHolland

Light tanks of the United Kingdom
Cold War tanks of the United Kingdom
World War II tanks of the United Kingdom
Abandoned military projects of the United Kingdom
Trial and research tanks of the United Kingdom